Zinat Pirzadeh (born 22 February 1967), is an Iranian Swedish female comedian, actress and writer. She has been called the "funniest female immigrant in Sweden." Her butterfly novel trilogy starting with Fjäril i koppel (Butterfly on a leash) (2011) has been translated into Polish and Norwegian. The second installment Vinterfjäril (Winter's Butterfly) was released in 2020.

References

External links

 Official website: Zinat Pirzadeh

1967 births
21st-century Swedish women writers
21st-century Swedish comedians
Actors of Iranian descent
Iranian diaspora film people
Iranian emigrants to Sweden
Living people
People from Sari, Iran
Swedish novelists
Swedish stand-up comedians
Swedish women comedians
Swedish women novelists
Swedish writers
Writers from Stockholm
Writers of Iranian descent
21st-century Swedish people